Fulengia is a dubious genus of basal sauropodomorph dinosaur from the Early Jurassic Lufeng Formation of China.

The type species, F. youngi, was described by Carroll and Galton in 1977. It is a nomen dubium, and may be the same animal as Lufengosaurus (from which it is anagramized). It was originally thought to be a lizard.

History
Twelve years later Carroll and Galton reclassified it as a lizard of Late Triassic age and named the species Fulengia youngi.

The holotype remains, and two other nodules (CUP 2038a and CUP 2038b) from the same site were also found during reinspection of the Catholic University of Peking collections in 1989. In 1989, Evans and Milner classified Fulengia as an Early Jurassic sauropodomorph.

Description

References

Sauropodomorphs
Early Jurassic dinosaurs of Asia
Taxa named by Peter Galton
Paleontology in Yunnan
Fossil taxa described in 1977